The 2013 Maserati Challenger was a professional tennis tournament played on clay courts. It was the first edition of the tournament which was part of the 2013 ATP Challenger Tour. It took taking place in Meerbusch, Germany, between 10 and 18 August 2013.

Entrants

Seeds 

 1 Rankings as of 5 August 2013

Other entrants 
The following players received wildcards into the singles main draw:
  Pavol Červenák
  Filip Horanský
  Robin Kern
  Alexander Zverev

The following players received entry from the qualifying draw:
  Miki Janković
  Gero Kretschmer
  Miliaan Niesten
  Alexey Vatutin

The following players received entry into the main draw as a lucky loser:
  Yannick Mertens

Champions

Singles 

  Jan Hájek def.  Jesse Huta Galung 6–3, 6–4

Doubles 

  Rameez Junaid /  Frank Moser def.  Dustin Brown /  Philipp Marx 6–3, 7–6(7–4)

External links 
 Official website

2013 ATP Challenger Tour
Maserati Challenger
Maserati Challenger